Pyramidella dolabrata, common name the "giant Atlantic pyram", is a somewhat variable species of small to medium-sized (max size 36 mm) sea snail, a marine gastropod mollusk in the (mostly minute) family Pyramidellidae, the pyram snails.

Description

The length of the shell varies between 14 mm and 36 mm.

The white shell is conical, turreted, polished, elongated, slightly transparent. It has three or four transverse, narrow reddish or chestnut spiral lines on the body whorl, and two on the whorls of the teleoconch. The middle band s always narrowest ; the others are wider and deeper colored. The pointed spire is composed of from ten to twelve distinct, smooth, slightly convex whorls. The body whorl is more inflated than the other whorls. The shell is smooth and umbilicated. The ovate aperture is subrotund at its base, and generally marked within, with very prominent ridges continued upon some specimens even to the edge of the sharp outer  lip. The outer lip is often lirate within.  The columella is slightly arcuated, recurved around the umbilicus. It is furnished at its base with three folds, the upper of which is more prominent than the others. The small umbilicus is cylindrical, narrow and deep.  The maximum recorded shell length is 36 mm.

Anatomy
The complete nucleotide sequence of  the mitochondrial genome of Pyramidella dolabrata has been available since 2008.

Distribution
This marine species has a wide distribution. It has been recorded in:
 The Caribbean Sea, the Gulf of Mexico, the Lesser Antilles
 The Atlantic Ocean off the Cape Verdes, St. Helena, São Tomé and Príncipe, Angola, West Africa
 The Indian Ocean : off Madagascar, Mauritius
 The Indo-Pacific Region.

Habitat
The minimum recorded depth for this species is 0 m. The maximum recorded depth is 57 m.

References

External links

 OBIS: Pyramidella dolabrata
 

Pyramidellidae
Gastropods described in 1758
Molluscs of the Atlantic Ocean
Molluscs of the Indian Ocean
Molluscs of Madagascar
Molluscs of Angola
Molluscs of Mauritius
Gastropods of Cape Verde
Invertebrates of São Tomé and Príncipe
Taxa named by Carl Linnaeus